Jerome Fleisch (born 2 April 1980) is an English professional wrestler, better known by his ring name Jody Fleisch. He is best known for his work with the Frontier Wrestling Alliance, One Pro Wrestling and Real Quality Wrestling. He is currently working for independent promotions all over the world.

Professional wrestling career
Fleisch studied Taekwondo, Ninjitsu and jujutsu for three years before joining wrestling. When Fleisch finally made his wrestling debut for NWA UK Hammerlock at the age of 16, he formed a tag team with Jonny Storm. Fleisch continued wrestling in the UK for many years as well as in the Netherlands and other countries.

Fleisch made his first appearance for Michinoku Pro in Japan where he wrestled in the Fukumen World League 1999 as "Dakko Chan". In the finals, Dakko Chan lost his mask in a mask vs. mask match against the "White Bear" (Jason Cross).

In summer 2001, he went down with a very serious elbow injury, suffered after an unsuccessful shooting star press. In February 2002 he made his return by winning Frontier Wrestling Alliance's King of England tournament by beating Doug Williams in the finals, after which "Dynamite Kid" Tom Billington presented him with a medal for winning.

In June 2002 Fleisch started taking bookings in the United States from companies like the Premier Wrestling Federation, Combat Zone Wrestling and Ring of Honor. During this time Fleisch was involved in tournament matches for top honours in both ROH's Road To The Title and CZW's Best of the Best. Fleisch came close to winning these tournaments but ultimately failed.
While back in England, Fleisch defeated Flash Barker to win the FWA Heavyweight title for the first time, only to be stripped of it on 3 August. On 13 October at FWA British Uprising Jody Fleisch beat Flash Barker again in a Ladder match to recapture the FWA Heavyweight title, during which Fleisch hit a jumping moonsault from a 12 feet high balcony onto Flash.

At FWA London Calling on 25 October, Christopher Daniels beat Fleisch and Doug Williams to capture the FWA Heavyweight title, and become the first non-British wrestler to do so in the process.

At ROH Final Battle, he defeated The Amazing Red and became part of the Special K stable becoming a heel for the first time in his career.

Throughout 2003, Fleisch wrestled mainly for both ROH and FWA, and in a cross promotional show between the two. During this time he faced such stars as Juventud Guerrera, Low Ki, Christopher Daniels, The Backseat Boyz, and James Tighe until September that year when Fleisch was forced to retire due to some minor injuries and personal problems, at the age of 23.

Jody Fleisch made his return after a year's absence to sign the Jonny Storm Reinstatement petition, to aid his friend's return to the FWA promotion. After the main event (James Tighe versus AJ Styles) Fleisch was beaten up by Tighe and Mark Belton. Fleisch finally came out of retirement, coming into the middle of a FWA ring to announce he will be returning to wrestling for FWA full-time.

Since that time Jody Fleisch has appeared as one of England's top stars performing in promotions all across the Europe for promotions like Irish Whip Wrestling, International Catch Wrestling Alliance, IPW:UK and also appeared at the Universal Uproar supershow. Fleisch went on to be a part of the 1 Pro Wrestling roster and become one half its tag team champions with long-time rival and friend Jonny Storm. He also made appearances during the first English tour of ROH in August 2006 and participated in the first King of Europe tournament in April 2007.

In 2009 Fleisch faced Último Dragón several times as part of the Nu-Wrestling Evolution promotion.

In 2018, Fleisch competed in Pro Wrestling Guerilla's Battle of Los Angeles, losing to CIMA in the first round.

Championships and accomplishments
Athletik Club Wrestling
ACW Tag Team Championship (1 time) - with Jonny Storm
Combat Zone Wrestling
CZW Match of the Year (2002) vs. Jonny Storm
Dynamic Over-The-Top Action Wrestling
DOA UK Adrenaline Championship (1 time)
Adrenaline Cup (2018) 
Frontier Wrestling Alliance
FWA British Heavyweight Championship (2 times)
FWA European Union Championship (1 time)
FWA King of England (2002)
FWA Round Robin Tournament (2005)
One Pro Wrestling
1PW Tag Team Championship (1 time) – with Jonny Storm
Pro Wrestling Illustrated
Ranked No. 419 of the top 500 singles wrestlers in the PWI 500 in 2018
Scottish School Of Wrestling
SSW Hardcore Championship (1 time)
The Wrestling Alliance
British Welterweight Championship (1 time)
Westside Xtreme Wrestling
wXw World Lightweight Championship (1 time)
Other titles
SCW Florida Championship (1 time)

References

External links
 

1980 births
English male professional wrestlers
Living people
People from Walthamstow